El Chico is an album by American jazz drummer Chico Hamilton featuring performances recorded in 1965 for the Impulse! label.

Reception
The Allmusic review by Scott Yanow stated: "The influences of Latin jazz, bossa nova, and the avant-garde are mixed into the unusual musical blend".

Track listing
All compositions by Chico Hamilton except as indicated
 "El Chico" - 4:06
 "People" (Bob Merrill, Jule Styne) - 6:06
 "Marcheta" (Victor Schertzinger) - 4:00
 "This Dream" (Leslie Bricusse, Anthony Newley) - 3:17
 "Conquistadores" (Willie Bobo, Chico Hamilton, Albert Stinson, Gábor Szabó, Bob Thiele) - 6:40
 "El Moors" - 2:22
 "Strange" (John La Touche, Marvin Fisher) - 4:46
 "Helena" - 4:20
Recorded in New York City on August 26 (tracks 3 & 7) and August 27 (tracks 1, 2, 4-6 & 8), 1965

Personnel
Chico Hamilton – drums
Jimmy Cheatham - trombone
Sadao Watanabe – alto saxophone
Gábor Szabó – guitar
Albert Stinson – bass
Willie Bobo, Victor Pantoja - percussion

References 

Impulse! Records albums
Chico Hamilton albums
1965 albums
Albums produced by Bob Thiele